HMNZS Hawea was a Lake-class inshore patrol vessel of the Royal New Zealand Navy. It was commissioned in 1975 and decommissioned in 1991.

Hawea was one of three ships of this name to serve in the Royal New Zealand Navy and is named after Lake Hāwea.

See also 
 Patrol boats of the Royal New Zealand Navy

Notes

References 
 McDougall, R J (1989) New Zealand Naval Vessels. Page 98-100. Government Printing Office. 

Lake-class patrol vessels
Ships built in Lowestoft